The Château de Kerduel, known as Kastell Kerduel in Breton, is a castle off the coast of northern Brittany, in the commune of Pleumeur-Bodou and the wider Canton of Tréguier. The castle and chapel are situated next to a small stream and lake, and the castle grounds have a large forest surrounding the property. The castle used to have fortified walls, but like many castles, they were removed over time.

History
The oldest part of the castle was built in the 12th century. Other parts of the castle were constructed in the 14th and late 19th centuries, so the castle has different styles.

Legend
Legend has it that King Arthur and the Knights of the Round Table lived at this castle, hence the name of the lodge in the oldest part of the pink granite castle: "Chamber of King Arthur ". In fact, the name of the castle, Kerduel, is thought to be associated with the Castle of "Carduel", known today as Carlisle. A castle some believe to be Camelot, the mythical seat of King Arthur's court. According to 14th century arthurian literature, one of King Arthur's knights, Sir Gawain, took the Castle from the Greene knight, the Carle (churl - old norse meaning freeman) of Carduel. By some accounts, in cold winter nights, when the tide is low at sea, King Arthur rises from his tomb on the island of Avalon (nearby island of Aval) to haunt the grounds of the Castle astride his white horse.

Art
Gustave Jean Jacquet depicted the castle in the background of "La danse."

References

Côtes-d'Armor
Castles in France
Locations associated with Arthurian legend